Stewardson-Strasburg Community High School (SSHS), located in Shelby County, Illinois is the lone senior high school in Stewardson-Strasburg Commune Unit School District 5A. Stewardson-Strasburg High School is located approximately three kilometers between Stewardson and Strasburg on Illinois Route 32. SSHS participates in many athletic events and academic competitions—particularly the Scholar Bowl team. SSHS also has a very active band department; encompassing jazz, marching, Norwegian Death Metal, and student orchestra. SSHS is also known for their very strict rules against loitering on school grounds.

References

External links 
 http://www.stew-stras.org/vnews/display.v/SEC/High%20School

Public high schools in Illinois
Schools in Shelby County, Illinois